Hong Kong has a long coastline that is full of twists and turns with many bays and beaches. Many of them are well sheltered by mountains nearby, as Hong Kong is a mountainous place. As a result, large waves seldom appear at the bays, making them suitable for human swimming.

However, with the increasing development and urbanisation of Hong Kong, water quality has worsened resulting in the closure of several beaches previously suitable for swimming. These include Approach Beach, Ting Kau Beach, Anglers' Beach, Gemini Beaches, Hoi Mei Wan Beach, Casam Beach and Lido Beach in Tsuen Wan. In 2011, Lido Beach, Casam Beach, Approach Beach and Hoi Mei Wan Beach were reopened following an improvement in water quality.

About half of the beaches suitable for swimming in Hong Kong are managed by the Leisure and Cultural Services Department (LCSD), and are officially referred to as gazetted beaches. A number of other beaches are privately owned or not gazetted, but are nonetheless publicly accessible.

Gazetted beaches 
A total of forty-two beaches in Hong Kong are managed by the LCSD. Twelve of them are located on Hong Kong Island, and the remaining 30 are located across the New Territories, including the Outlying Islands. Some are temporarily closed to swimmers.

Full list 

Tuen Mun District
1. Butterfly Beach
2. Castle Peak Beach
3. Kadoorie Beach
4. Cafeteria Old Beach
5. Cafeteria New Beach
6. Golden Beach
Tsuen Wan District
7. Anglers' Beach
8. Gemini Beaches
9. Hoi Mei Wan Beach
10. Casam Beach
11. Lido Beach
12. Ting Kau Beach
13. Approach Beach
14. Ma Wan Tung Wan Beach
Sai Kung District
15. Trio Beach
16. Kiu Tsui Beach
17. Hap Mun Bay Beach
18. Silverstrand Beach
19. Clear Water Bay First Beach
20. Clear Water Bay Second Beach

Hong Kong Island
21. Deep Water Bay Beach
22. Repulse Bay Beach
23. Middle Bay Beach
24. 
25. Chung Hom Kok Beach
26. St. Stephen's Beach
27. Stanley Main Beach
28. Hairpin Beach
29. Turtle Cove Beach
30. Shek O Beach
31. Rocky Bay Beach
32. Big Wave Bay Beach
Lamma Island
33. Hung Shing Yeh Beach
34. Lo So Shing Beach
Cheung Chau
35. Kwun Yam Beach
36. Cheung Chau Tung Wan Beach
Lantau Island
37. Silver Mine Bay Beach
38. Pui O Beach
39. Upper Cheung Sha Beach
40. Lower Cheung Sha Beach
41. Tong Fuk Beach
Tai Po District
42. Tai Po Lung Mei Beach

Tuen Mun

Kadoorie Beach

Kadoorie Beach is located at 18¾ milestone, Castle Peak Road. The enquires of the beach are 2450 6336 and 2451 3461. There are BBQ area, changing rooms, shower facilities and toilet. Lifeguard service hours are 0900–1800 in April to May, September to October, and also on Mondays to Fridays in June to August. On Saturdays, Sundays and public holidays in June to August, lifeguard service hours are 0800–1900. Lifeguard services are suspended during winter (November to March).

Cafeteria Old Beach
Cafeteria Old Beach is located at 18¾ milestone, Castle Peak Road. The enquires of the beach are 2450 6306 and 2451 3461. There are refreshment kiosk, BBQ area, changing room, shower facilities, toilet and bathing shed. Lifeguard service hours are 0900–1800 in April to May, September to October, and also on Mondays to Fridays in June to August. On Saturdays, Sundays and public holidays in June to August, lifeguard service hours are 0800–1900. Lifeguard services are suspended during winter (November to March).

Cafeteria New Beach
Cafeteria New Beach is located at 18½ milestone, Castle Peak Road. The enquires of the beach are 2450 6440 and 2451 3461. There are refreshment kiosk and beach volleyball court. Lifeguard service hours are 0900–1800 in April to May, September to October, and also on Mondays to Fridays in June to August. On Saturdays, Sundays and public holidays in June to August, lifeguard service hours are 0800–1900. Lifeguard services are suspended during winter (November to March).

Golden Beach
Golden Beach is located at the 18½ milestone of Castle Peak Road, Tuen Mun. It is the largest beach in Tuen Mun with a total area of 78,500 m² and a length of 545 metres. It is the first artificial beach in Hong Kong. It is classified as a Grade 2 beach, meaning that the water quality is fair. Refreshment kiosks, a hotel and a shopping mall are to be found adjacent to the beach.

Golden Beach is unique amongst the beaches of Hong Kong in that it has a volleyball court. The Hong Kong Beach Volleyball Team occasionally practises on Golden Beach.

Golden Beach is served by KMB bus routes 52X (Tuen Mun Central ↔ Mong Kok), 53 (Yuen Long station ↔ Tsuen Wan), 61A (Yau Oi South → Tuen Mun Road Interchange), 61M (Yau Oi South ↔ Lai King North), 252B (Handsome Court → Tsim Sha Tsui), 252X (Handsome Court/Chi Lok Fa Yuen ↔ Lam Tin station) and 261B (Sam Shing → Kowloon station);
by Citybus bus routes 962/N962 (Lung Mun Oasis ↔ Causeway Bay), 962B/962S (Chi Lok Fa Yuen ↔ Causeway Bay);
by Long Win Bus bus routes A33 (Airport ↔ Tuen Mun Road Interchange);
by MTR Bus feeder bus routes K51 (Fu Tai ↔ Tai Lam) and K53 (Tuen Mun station ↺ So Kwun Wat).

Tsuen Wan

Ma Wan Tung Wan Beach – Ma Wan 
Ma Wan Tung Wan Beach is located on Ma Wan island.

Hong Kong Island

Deep Water Bay Beach 

Deep Water Bay Beach is located on southern Hong Kong Island. See Deep Water Bay Beach.

Repulse Bay Beach 
Repulse Bay Beach, traditionally Hong Kong's most popular because of its easy access by bus and extensive facilities, is located on southern Hong Kong Island. See Repulse Bay Beach.

Middle Bay Beach and South Bay Beach 
These two small beaches at South Bay and Middle Bay are located within walking distance of Repulse Bay Beach. However, since they are not directly accessible by public transport, they tend to be quieter and less crowded than Repulse Bay.

Turtle Cove Beach 
The beach situated east of Stanley and west of Tai Tam Reservoir is Turtle Cove Beach which is a Grade 1 beach. Being less than 70 meters long, it can easily be considered as a "baby beach". Turtle Cove is very well equipped; with changing rooms, toilets and showers as well as a small playground, a soft drinks kiosk and seven barbecue pits.

Turtle Cove Beach is accessible by bus No.14 from exit A of the Sai Wan Ho MTR station or mini-bus 16X from Chai Wan; the beach is located near the Red Hill estate stop (past the Tai Tam Reservoir). From near the bus stop, stairs lead down the hill to the beach.

Big Wave Bay Beach
Big Wave Bay Beach in Southern District is also the site of prehistoric rock carvings similar to those found on Cheung Chau Island. Not to be confused with other places called Big Wave Bay or Tai Long Wan in Hong Kong.

Lamma Island

Hung Shing Yeh Beach 
Hung Shing Yeh Beach is the most popular beach on Lamma Island. The sand on the beach is very fine, like powder. The water of the Beach is clean and it is classified as a Grade 1 beach.

Near the beach, there is a barbecue area, refreshment kiosk, and shower and changing facilities.

There is no public transport on Lamma Island. To reach the beach one must travel to Yung Shue Wan from Central by ferry, and then walk for about 20 minutes. The route is signposted.

Lo So Shing Beach 
Lo So Shing Beach is located on Lamma Island about halfway between the main villages of Yung Shue Wan and Sok Kwu Wan. The water of the beach is clean and it is classified as a Grade 1 beach. Some years ago the government of Hong Kong built shower and refreshment facilities there, which remain almost unused because of the beach's remote location and the absence of public transport.

To reach the beach one must travel to Yung Shue Wan or Sok Kwu Wan from Central by ferry, and then walk for about 40 minutes.

Cheung Chau

Cheung Chau Tung Wan Beach and Kwun Yam Beach 

There are two main beaches on Cheung Chau: Cheung Chau Tung Wan Beach and Kwun Yam Beach aka. Afternoon Beach. Although they are not as big as the well-known beaches along the Hong Kong Island coast, they do have their own qualities. Kwun Yam Beach is a beautiful fine white beach situated on the east coast of Cheung Chau. The water quality is good and it is classified as a Grade 1 beach. It provides many water sports facilities, particularly for sailboarding. Many lovers like to take leisurely walks there and to enjoy the village scene which still keeps the old traditions. Also, it is the place where Hong Kong's first Olympic medallist, Lee Lai Shan, practised when she was young. A formal monument to her achievement is erected in the children's playground on Tung Wan Beach, while an unofficial monument is to be found beside the "windsurfer" café owned by her uncle, which is situated between the two beaches.

Lantau Island

Silver Mine Bay Beach 

Hong Kong's largest island, Lantau, has several beaches which are clean, uncrowded and relatively convenient to reach. For all of them, the first step is to simply take the ferry from Central to Mui Wo. Then, if necessary, one can just hop on a bus.

Silver Mine Bay Beach, which is a Grade 1 beach, is the easiest one to get to, since it is located about a 5-minute walk away from the Mui Wo ferry pier. Since there is a sandbar area, this beach is ideal for flinging frisbees or flying kites. Further along the beach is a swimming area with several lifeguards on duty. Many visitors rent a bike for the afternoon, and stop off at the many refreshment kiosks and little restaurants along the road fronting the beach. If people do not feel like hurrying back into the city, they can also choose to stay overnight at the Silvermine Beach Hotel, located right on the waterfront. Also, there are several other hotels and guesthouses in the area where people can stay.

Pui O Beach

Cheung Sha Beaches 

Cheung Sha Beach is located in Cheung Sha, on the southern shore of Lantau Island. It is divided into two parts by a small headland: Upper Cheung Sha Beach (east) and Lower Cheung Sha Beach (west). It is 3 km long and is one of the longest beaches in Hong Kong. The beaches are accessible from South Lantau Road. Tong Fuk Beach is located nearby, to the west of Lower Cheung Sha Beach.

Tong Fuk Beach

Non-gazetted beaches 
Many of these beaches are difficult to reach. Because they are not maintained by the government, some may be unclean at times. As no lifeguards are on duty, swimmers are recommended to exercise caution. Non-gazetted beaches are also not equipped with shark nets. Some, e.g., Hoi Ha, lie within protected areas.

Chung Wan South Crooked Harbour, North District
Cheung Sha Wan Northeast Ping Chau
Crescent Bay Crescent Island, Mirs Bay
Lo Kei Wan Crescent Island, Mirs Bay
Tung Wan Wong Wan Chau, Mirs Bay
Wu Kai Sha Wu Kai Sha, Ma On Shan
Lung Mei Plover Cove, East Tai Po
Hoi Ha Wan Hoi Ha Wan, North Sai Kung Peninsula
Nam She Wan East Sai Kung, Mirs Bay
Tung Wan East Sai Kung, Tai Long Wan
Tai Wan East Sai Kung, Tai Long Wan
Ham Tin Wan East Sai Kung, Tai Long Wan
Tai Long Sai Wan East Sai Kung, Tai Long Wan
Long Ke Wan Long Ke Wan, East Sai Kung
Long Ke Tsai Long Ke Wan, East Sai Kung
Pak Sha Chau Sai Kung Hoi, Sai Kung
Pak Lap Wan High Island, South Sai Kung
Ma Tau Wan High Island, South Sai Kung
Kam Lo Wan High Island, South Sai Kung
Nam Fung Wan High Island, South Sai Kung
Kau Sai Wan Kau Sai Chau, Sai Kung
Whiskey Kau Sai Chau, Sai Kung
Campers' Bay Port Shelter, Clearwater Bay
Pak Shui Wun Port Shelter, Clearwater Bay
Bayside Port Shelter, Clearwater Bay
Little Palm Port Shelter, Clearwater Bay
Lung Ha Wan Port Shelter, Clearwater Bay
Ung Kong Wan Bluff Island, Clearwater Bay
Lung Kwu Upper Lung Kwu Tan, west Tuen Mun
Lung Kwu Lower Lung Kwu Tan, Tuen Mun
Dragon Bay Tsing Lung Tau, Tsuen Wan
To Tei Wan Shek O, Cape D'Aguilar
Tai Pak Wan Discovery Bay, East Lantau Island
Tai Long Wan Chi Ma Wan, South Lantau Island
Yi Long Wan Chi Ma Wan, South Lantau Island
Sha Lo Wan West Tung Chung, North Lantau Island
Tai Long Wan Shek Pik, South Lantau Island
Lo Kei Wan Shui Hau, South Lantau Island
Kau Ling Chung Fan Lau, Southwest Lantau Island
Fan Lau Tung Wan Fan Lau, Southwest Lantau Island
Fan Lan Sai Wan Fan Lau, Southwest Lantau Island
Luk Keng Wan Yam O, Northeast Lantau Island
Tai Kwai Wan Northwest Cheung Chau
Po Yue Wan Southwest Cheung Chau
Pak Tso Wan Southwest Cheung Chau
Shek Pai Wan Southeast Lamma Island
Mo Tat Wan East Lamma Island
Kwo Chau Wan Tai Chau, Ninepin Group
Siu A Chau Wan Siu A Chau, Soko Islands

Water quality grading system 
Gazetted beaches in Hong Kong are classified into four grades ( Grades 1 – 4 ) according to the level of E. coli in the water of the beaches. This is done by the Environmental Protection Department. Every week, water samples of each beach are collected for analysis to find out their bacterial level.

Grade 1 means that the water qualities of the beaches are good. The amount of E. coli is no more than 24 counts per 100 mL of beach water. Also no related case of skin and gastrointestinal illnesses has been reported by swimmers who have swum at these beaches.

Grade 2 means that the water qualities of the beaches are fair. The amount of E. coli is about 25 – 180 counts per 100 mL of beach water. Also the rate of skin and gastrointestinal illnesses is no more than 10 cases per 1000 swimmers.

Grade 3 means that the water qualities of the beaches are poor. The amount of E. coli is about 181 – 610 counts per 100 mL of beach water. Also the rate of skin and gastrointestinal illnesses is about 11 – 15 cases per 1000 swimmers.

Grade 4 means that the water quality is very poor. The amount of E. coli is greater than 610 counts per 100 mL of beach water. Also the rate of skin and gastrointestinal illnesses is greater than 15 cases per 1000 swimmers. As a result, swimmers are advised not to swim at Grade 4 beaches.

See also

 List of beaches
 Environment of Hong Kong
 Geography of Hong Kong
 Conservation in Hong Kong
 List of places in Hong Kong
 Shark net
 Swimming shed

References

External links

Leisure and Cultural Services Department: Public Beaches on Hong Kong Island
Leisure and Cultural Services Department: Public Beaches in the New Territories
Environmental Protection Department
Grading of beach water quality
Beaches of Hong Kong, from HK-place.com

 
Places in Hong Kong
Hong Kong geography-related lists
Hong Kong
Lists of landforms of Hong Kong
Swimming in Hong Kong